The 1856 United States presidential election in Wisconsin was held on November 4, 1856 as part of the 1856 United States presidential election. State voters chose five electors to the Electoral College, who voted for president and vice president.

John C. Frémont of the newly formed Republican Party won Wisconsin with 55% of the popular vote, winning the state's five electoral votes.

Due to a snowstorm, Wisconsin's five electors could not convene on the constitutionally-mandated date to cast their electoral votes. They instead met on a later date and cast five votes for Frémont for president and five votes for William L. Dayton for vice president. During the joint session of Congress to count the electoral votes, objections were raised that Wisconsin's votes were invalid because they had not been cast on the correct day. After a two-day debate in which the President of the Senate attempted to unilaterally count Wisconsin's votes in the face of objections from the joint session, the matter was dropped because it was immaterial to the overall outcome of the election.

Fremont’s victory was the first of nine consecutive Republican victories in the state, as Wisconsin would not vote for a Democratic candidate again until Grover Cleveland in 1892.

Results

See also
 United States presidential elections in Wisconsin

References

Wisconsin
1856 Wisconsin elections
1856